Listed here are notable ethnic groups and populations from Western Asia, Egypt and South Caucasus by human Y-chromosome DNA haplogroups based on relevant studies. The samples are taken from individuals identified with the ethnic and linguistic designations in the first two columns, the third column gives the sample size studied, and the other columns give the percentage of the particular haplogroup. (IE = Indo-European, AA = Afro-Asiatic) Some old studies conducted in the early 2000s regarded several haplogroups as one haplogroup, e.g. I, G and sometimes J were haplogroup 2, so conversion sometimes may lead to unsubstantial frequencies below.

Table

See also 
 Near East and North Africa
 Genetic history of North Africa
 Demographics of the Arab League
 Genetic history of the Middle East
 Genetic origins of the Turkish people
 Y-chromosomal Aaron
 Y-DNA haplogroups by population
 Y-DNA haplogroups in populations of Europe
 Y-DNA haplogroups in populations of North Africa
 Y-DNA haplogroups in populations of Sub-Saharan Africa
 Y-DNA haplogroups in populations of the Caucasus
 Y-DNA haplogroups in populations of South Asia
 Y-DNA haplogroups in populations of Central and North Asia
 Y-DNA haplogroups in populations of East and Southeast Asia
 Y-DNA haplogroups in populations of Oceania
 Y-DNA haplogroups in indigenous peoples of the Americas

References

External links 
 Y-DNA Ethnographic and Genographic Atlas and Open-Source Data Compilation

Near East